Ja'far Kavian (born 1895 in Tabriz — death 1975 in Baku) was an Iranian Azerbaijani politician and military. he was a Major general in the Azerbaijan's Government Army and was Minister of War in the Pishevari cabinet.

Notes

References
 *
 Джамиль Гасанлы.'' СССР—Иран. Азербайджанский кризис и начало холодной войны. 1941–1946. — M., Герои Отечества, 2006 

1895 births
1975 deaths
People from Tabriz
Azerbaijani Democratic Party politicians
Azerbaijani people of Iranian descent
Iranian emigrants to the Soviet Union
People granted political asylum in the Soviet Union